Spiral Live at Montreux 1978 is a live album by Muhal Richard Abrams recorded at the Montreux Jazz Festival and released on the Arista Novus label in 1978.

Reception
The Allmusic review by Scott Yanow states "Abrams' occasional use of devices from earlier styles (including a bit of dissonant stride and basslines à la Lennie Tristano) makes this music a bit more accessible than one might expect at times, but in general, this set is for listeners who enjoy hearing new approaches to musical freedom".

Track listing
All compositions by Muhal Richard Abrams
 "B Song" - 13:50 
 "String Song" - 5:05
 "Voice Song" - 23:33
Recorded at the Montreux Jazz Festival, Switzerland on July 22, 1978

Personnel
Muhal Richard Abrams – piano

References

Muhal Richard Abrams albums
1978 live albums
Novus Records live albums
Solo piano jazz albums